Medial may refer to:

Mathematics 
 Medial magma, a mathematical identity in algebra

Geometry 
 Medial axis, in geometry the set of all points having more than one closest point on an object's boundary
 Medial graph, another graph that represents the adjacencies between edges in the faces of a plane graph
 Medial triangle, the triangle whose vertices lie at the midpoints of an enclosing  triangle's sides
 Polyhedra:
 Medial deltoidal hexecontahedron
 Medial disdyakis triacontahedron
 Medial hexagonal hexecontahedron
 Medial icosacronic hexecontahedron
 Medial inverted pentagonal hexecontahedron
 Medial pentagonal hexecontahedron
 Medial rhombic triacontahedron

Linguistics
 A medial sound or letter is one that is found in the middle of a larger unit (like a word)
 Syllable medial, a segment located between the onset and the rime of a syllable
 In the older literature, a term for the voiced stops (like b, d, g)
 Medial or second person demonstrative, a demonstrative indicating things near the addressee

Anatomy
 Medial (anatomy), term of location meaning 'towards the centre'
 Medial ligament (disambiguation), term used for various ligaments toward the midline of the human body
 Medial rotation, rotation toward the centre of the body

See also
 Medial border (disambiguation)
 Medial plantar (disambiguation)
 Medial wall (disambiguation)
 Median (disambiguation)
 Medial capitals or CamelCase, use of capital letters in the middle of a compound word or abbreviation
 Mid vowel, a vowel sound pronounced with the tongue midway between open and closed vowel positions
 Medial s  <ſ>, a form of the letter s written in the middle of a word
 Human anatomical terms § Standard terms